Mikita Badziakouski (born February 6, 1992) is a Belarusian professional poker player known for his accomplishments in live poker tournaments.

Poker career
Badziakouski began playing live tournaments in 2010, at the age of 18.

Badziakouski plays online poker under the alias fish2013 on PokerStars and HelicopterBen82 on Full Tilt Poker. He chose the number 2013 in his screen name because that was the year he would turn 21 and be able to play for a WSOP title in America.

In May 2018, Badziakouski won the Triton Super High Roller Series Montenegro festival held at the Maestral Resort & Casino, winning $2,499,090 in the process. In August, he won the 2018 EPT Barcelona €100,000 Super High Roller, his fourth title of the year, winning him $1,930,851.

After winning the short deck hold 'em event held at King's Casino Rozvadov in October 2018, Badziakouski was dubbed the "Short Deck Poker king".

In September 2019, Mikita Badziakouski lost £50,000 NLHE at the British Poker Open 2019. Mikita defeated Cristoph Vogelsang Heads-Up To Earn £486,000.

As of February 2020, Badziakouski has earned over $2,200,000 playing high stakes online cash games on PokerStars and has earned over $26,000,000 from live poker tournaments. He is the all-time money leader in Belarus.

References

External links
 Mikita Badziakouski Hendon Mob profile

Belarusian poker players
Living people
1992 births